Hurray for the Riff Raff is a band from New Orleans formed with changing members by Alynda Segarra, a singer-songwriter from the Bronx, New York, after they had moved to New Orleans in 2007.

As Segarra's project, the group originally performed different styles of folk music while releasing several albums independently.

Background 
Alynda Mariposa Segarra (formerly known as alynda lee) was raised by their aunt and uncle in the Bronx where they developed an early appreciation for doo-wop and Motown. They are an American rock musician of Puerto Rican heritage.

Segarra became a regular attendee of hardcore punk shows at ABC No Rio when they were young. They left their home in the Bronx at age 17, spending time crossing North America, hopping freight trains.

Around 2007, Segarra became a part of the Dead Man Street Orchestra, a hobo band that was documented in a photo essay by Time Magazine in 2007. Segarra traveled with the group for two years, releasing two independent albums and embarking on freight train tours across the country.

Musical career 

In 2008, Segarra self-released Hurray for the Riff Raff's first studio album, It Don't Mean I Don't Love You, followed by another self-released album, Young Blood Blues, in 2010. In February 2011, Hurray for the Riff Raff were featured in an article in The Times based around the HBO TV series Treme, with their track "Daniella" having been included in the show's selection of New Orleans' essential songs.

On 21 March 2011, Hurray for the Riff Raff released their self-titled CD on Loose Music in Europe, composed of Segarra's favorite songs from the band's two previous records. Tracks from this indie-label debut release by the band received airplay on BBC Radio 2 and BBC 6 Music.

In May 2012, Hurray for the Riff Raff released Look Out Mama on their own label, Born to Win Records, as well as on Loose Music in Europe. No Depression said it "sounds like something The Band would’ve had playing on a Victorola while making Music From Big Pink in Woodstock." The album was recorded in Nashville, Tennessee at The Bomb Shelter Studios and produced by Andrija Tokic (Alabama Shakes). The record features the single "End of the Line".

My Dearest Darkest Neighbor was then released on July 1, 2013 through Mod Mobilian Records and This Is American Music. The album was previously available only as a Kickstarter reward and in limited local release and featured handmade covers. Tracks on the record include songs by Townes Van Zandt, Billie Holiday, Gillian Welch, Leadbelly, John Lennon, Lucinda Williams, Joni Mitchell, Hank Williams, and George Harrison, and features Segarra's interpretation of Gillian Welch's "Ruination Day".

Wall Street Journal describes Segarra's singing thus: "She has a subtle, expressive voice that she wraps around songs that draw on the sounds and styles of the American South, and her lyrics often take unconventional tack on traditional subjects."

Spin previewed a video of the band's song "St. Roch Blues".

In February 2014, Hurray for the Riff Raff had their ATO Records debut with Small Town Heroes. The record featured “The Body Electric,” a song that NPR’s Ann Powers called “The Political Song of the Year” in 2014 and says the album "sweeps across eras and genres with grace and grit."

Describing Segarra's music, NPR says "Segarra's morning-after alto might be the least showy great voice to hit the national scene this year."

In early July 2016, the band played the Danish festival of Roskilde to an enthusiastic audience. In December 2016, they announced a new record, The Navigator, on Pitchfork with the first single from the album, "Rican Beach." The album was released on March 10, 2017 on ATO Records.

In late 2018, Segarra joined organizers of the Newport Folk Festival to travel to Puerto Rico and deliver instruments to various public schools. During that visit, Segarra played their first concert at La Respuesta in Santurce.

In 2019, HftRR's "Pa'lante" won Best Music Video at the SXSW Film Festival Jury and Specials Awards.

In 2021, Nonesuch Records announced Hurray for the Riff Raff's debut album on the label. Life on Earth was released on February 18, 2022. Its eleven new “nature punk” tracks on the theme of survival are "music for a world in flux—songs about thriving, not just surviving, while disaster is happening." Leading up to its release, Stereogum made it their album of the week, noting that the album's "sonic backdrop is fluid yet unmistakable no matter what form it takes. Even at their most synthetic, these tracks come across as earthy and alive—an extension of their environment. Even at their smallest and quietest, they feel huge." The album was met with critical acclaim upon its release.

Personal life 
Alynda lives in New Orleans, is non-binary, and uses they/them pronouns.

Discography

References

Further reading
 Hurray for the Riff Raff, Newport Folk Festival 2013 - Newport Folk Festival (Newport, RI)
 Hurray for the Riff Raff, January 9, 2014 - WFUV (New York, NY)

External links
 
 

Musical groups from New Orleans
Musical groups established in 2007
American folk musical groups
Loose Music artists
ATO Records artists
Nonesuch Records artists